Yewon Arts University is a private university located in Imsil County, North Jeolla province, South Korea.   Undergraduate courses of study include painting, jewelry design, cultural product design, visual imaging, animation, music, dance, comedy, and cultural property preservation, as well as e-business and leisure studies.  Campus facilities include a library and broadcasting facility.  The dormitory is located in neighboring Jeonju City.

Notable people
 Kim Shin-young, comedienne

See also
List of colleges and universities in South Korea
Education in South Korea

External links 
 Official school website

Universities and colleges in North Jeolla Province
Imsil County